The 1902 Nashville Garnet and Blue football team represented the University of Nashville during the 1902 Southern Intercollegiate Athletic Association football season. The team was coached by Neil Snow. Transylvania's W. Yancey ran for two 80-yard touchdowns.

After the season, Snow resigned never to coach again, accepting a construction position in New York.

Schedule

References

Nashville
Nashville Garnet and Blue football seasons
Nashville Garnet and Blue football